Night of the Twisters is a 1996 made-for-television disaster film that was directed by Timothy Bond. The film premiered on The Family Channel (now Freeform) on February 11, 1996, as the cable channel's first original movie (and appeared on the channel until 2004, under its successor brands Fox Family and ABC Family).

Filmed in Kleinburg, Ontario, Canada, it is based loosely on the 1984 young-adult novel of the same title by Ivy Ruckman, itself a semi-fictionalized account of an outbreak of seven tornadoes that struck Grand Island, Nebraska on June 3, 1980, which killed five people and injured 134 others; the film adaptation, however, is set in the fictional Nebraska town of Blainsworth, which serves as a stand-in for Grand Island. The film centers on a family's struggle to survive a night as a bizarre tornado-producing supercell thunderstorm tracks into and becomes stationary over their town.

Plot
The film's prologue takes place at 1:16 p.m. in an area of rural farmland in Dannebrog, Nebraska on an unspecified date in the Fall of 1996. Bob Iverson, a storm chaser with the Kansas State Tornado Center relaying information to the National Weather Service on a chase assignment, is driving down a country road to track a bizarre supercell thunderstorm. While observing the storm, Bob spots a tornado touching down almost a mile south of his location; he warns a family living nearby, right as the family's daughter Sarah, arrives home from school, about the oncoming twister, which sends them running into their root cellar just before it destroys their farm.

Meanwhile, in Blainsworth, Nebraska (120 miles southwest of Dannebrog), aspiring teenage artist Dan Hatch, who is constantly being pushed by his stepfather, Jack, to be an athlete, participates in a bicycle race and damages his bike; Jack pushes Danny into finishing the race on his bum bike, where he falls behind the other racers. Much to his luck, he wins a new bike in a raffle held by a local bank. While trying out his new bike, Dan and his best friend Arthur Darlington run into Arthur's two sisters, Stacey (whom Dan is infatuated with) and Ronnie Vae, while at the park. Dan and Arthur arrive home as the former's mother Laura is preparing dinner, when she also asks Dan to tend to his baby half-brother, Ryan. Later, Laura's sister, Dan's aunt Jenny, calls to inform her that they have been assigned to fill-in shifts as waitresses at the Salty Dawg, the local diner where they both work. Because Jack will not have enough time to take Laura to work, Jenny volunteers to take her.

At 3:37 p.m., while continuing to track the severe weather creeping toward the town, Bob decides to head southwest into Blainsworth, as Stan, the meteorologist Bob is radioing to, is astonished at the rogue anticyclonic spring-like weather pattern for the fall; while there, Bob meets Laura while getting some coffee at the diner. That evening, when Jack arrives home and sits down to watch TV, the show he is watching is interrupted by a KHAS-12 weather update, reporting a tornado 14 miles northwest of Blainsworth, and a tornado warning has been issued for St. Paul, Dannebrog and rural Howard County, Nebraska. Soon after Jack leaves to check on his mother, Dan's grandmother Belle, who was asleep in her rocking chair when he phoned her, tornado sirens suddenly blare throughout town, only to cut off abruptly as Dan goes to get Ryan from his crib. The eerie stillness outside afterward suddenly gives way to a violent tornado that approaches Blainsworth's Capital Heights neighborhood, with the sucking noises emitting from the drains notifying Dan and Arthur of its pending arrival; they and Ryan take cover in the basement bathroom's shower tub as the twister starts to obliterate the Hatch residence.

After Dan and Arthur escape from the basement of the leveled house through the collapsing floor beams from the first floor, and look in awe of the rubble that was once the Hatches' home, Arthur runs into Stacey and Ronnie Vae, who both survived the twister themselves in the Darlington's home (their parents were out of town on a trip back home to California at the time the storm hit). As Dan struggles to find his own family, Laura and Jenny are trapped inside the Salty Dawg (as they were taking cover inside, due to Jenny's 1992 Buick Skylark malfunctioning when she went to pick up Laura), which also was destroyed by one of the tornadoes. Dan and Stacey then go save Belle, at her farm; the two teenagers find Belle underneath wooden boards blown onto her from off of the partially damaged barn near her house (which itself survived intact).

As Dan and Stacey rush in the car to get Belle treated for her injuries, Dan finds Jack on a closed road, with his truck – which was overturned by the tornado, pinning him underneath it – covered in fallen power lines; he pulls Jack out from under the truck (with the help of emergency crews, after an earlier attempt by Dan and Stacey to push the truck in order to free him nearly injures Jack further), seeing this as an opportunity for his father to finally see him as reliable. However, Jack just gives a simple thank-you to the fact that Dan saved him from multiple dangers, even though his stepson may have been the only one down the road who was able to help him as it was blocked by policemen due to it being blocked by the downed lines, debris and broken underground utility lines. Later that night at the shelter, Dan reveals to Stacey that Jack is only his stepfather and that his real father, Daniel Sr., was a pilot who was killed in a plane crash when Dan was 6. After telling her that he feels he is not good enough in Jack's eyes and talks about the good qualities that his stepfather has, Stacey helps Dan consider that the two could try to find some common ground.

Eventually, Jack, followed by Dan, who sneaks himself and Ryan into the Jeep Wagoneer loaned to Jack, leave the shelter to go and look for Laura. Just as Bob pulls his truck into the driveway of the destroyed house, helping passengers Jenny and Laura along with him searching for Jack, Dan and Ryan, Jack's Jeep also drives up and the family is reunited. As soon as everyone is relieved they survived the storm, three tornadoes touch down near them. Bob, realizing that there is no adequate shelter available, advises the group to make a run for it in their vehicles. The group narrowly escapes one of the twisters, which picks up a car that the Hatches' neighbors try to outrun the tornado in themselves, destroys several buildings in its path and hurls a tree branch into the windshield, briefly knocking Jack unconscious and prompting Dan to take over driving the vehicle out of the storm's path. They, along with Bob and Jenny, make it to an overpass as the twister blows out the back window of the Jeep, nearly sucking Dan out before it dissipates into the air. As they walk out from under the overpass just as the sun rises on a clear day after the storm passes, Jack admits he's proud of Danny for not giving up in the face of adversity and trying to reunite the family.

In the film's epilogue, illustrating what happened with the characters one year after the storm, Dan explains that he is now dating Stacey, while Arthur became class president, Bob and Jenny got married and are becoming first-time parents to twins, Dan and Jack have also become closer, Jack is now supportive of him, and also taking up some new hobbies after his sporting goods shop was destroyed by the storm, and also Belle died in 1997.

Cast
 Devon Sawa as Danny Hatch
 John Schneider as Jack Hatch
 Lori Hallier as Laura Hatch
 David Ferry as Bob Iverson
 Helen Hughes as Grandma Belle "Zephyr" Hatch
 Amos Crawley as Arthur Darlington
 Laura Bertram as Stacey Darlington
 Jhene Irwin as Jenny Hatch
 Alex and Thomas Lastewka as Ryan Hatch

Reception
At the time of the film's release in 1996, Night of the Twisters received positive ratings when it aired on The Family Channel, but received very poor reviews from critics, many of whom criticized the special effects used in the film. The Family Channel continued to air the film until 2004, under its Fox Family and ABC Family brands.

Availability
Night of the Twisters was released on VHS by GoodTimes Entertainment and MTM Home Video shortly after its television release. As VHS became less popular, the film was re-released on DVD by GT Media  in 2006. , both the VHS and DVD versions are currently out of print.

References

External links
 

ABC Family original films
Films set in Nebraska
1996 television films
1996 films
American disaster films
1990s English-language films
Canadian disaster films
Canadian television films
English-language Canadian films
Films shot in Ontario
Films about tornadoes
Disaster television films
Alliance Atlantis films
MTM Enterprises films
Films directed by Timothy Bond
1990s American films
1990s Canadian films